Nadine Broersen (born 29 April 1990) is a Dutch track and field athlete, specializing in the heptathlon and high jump. She was the 2014 World Indoor pentathlon champion. Broersen competes for the track and field club AV Sprint in Breda.

Early career
Broersen is a member of the Dutch national combined events squad and trains at the Olympic Training centre in Papendal in the Netherlands since 2009. Because she was good in three essential events – 100 metres hurdles, high jump and the javelin throw – she was advised to specialize in the heptathlon, despite her fear for the 800 metres.

After decent results at the 2009 European Athletics Junior Championships, the 2011 European Athletics U23 Championships, and an 8th place at the prestigious Hypo-Meeting in Gotzis (Austria) in 2012, Broersen was selected to compete at the 2012 Summer Olympics in London in the women's heptathlon event, where she finished 13th with a personal best score of 6319 points.

At the 2013 European Athletics Indoor Championships in Gothenburg (Sweden) she was on course for a medal in the pentathlon, but was disqualified for a lane violation in the final event, the 800m. However, she finished 2nd at the Hypo-Meeting behind Brianne Theisen from Canada. At the 2013 World Championships in Athletics in Moscow (Russia) she competed in the women's heptathlon, but started very bad by falling over the last hurdle in the 100 m hurdles. In the later disciplines however, she continued very strong and finished 10th, with her teammate Dafne Schippers finishing 3rd. Had she not fallen at the hurdles, she probably would have finished on the podium.

2014 World Indoor Champion

On March 7, 2014, Broersen won gold at the World Indoor championships in Sopot (Poland) in the indoor pentathlon, improving the national record of Karin Ruckstuhl with a score of 4830 points. On the way to that result she also improved the national indoor record in the high jump, with a height of 1.93m. That year she finished 4th at Gotzis, scoring 6536 points, which would have been a Dutch record, had Schippers not finished nine points ahead.

She set her personal best at 6539 points winning the heptathlon in Torun (Poland) in July 2014, just six points short of the national record set earlier that year by Schippers. Later that year she won silver at the 2014 European Athletics Championships in Zurich (Switzerland) in the heptathlon behind France's Antoinette Nana Djimou, breaking the outdoor national record in the high jump with 1.94m. That year she won the 2014 IAAF Combined Events Challenge.

The next year, starting as one of the favourites at the 2015 European Athletics Indoor Championships, she had to give up due to an injured ankle incurred at the Dutch national indoor championships. Nevertheless, outdoor she finished 3rd in Gotzis and 4th at the 2015 World Championships in Athletics hepthatlon in Beijing (China). Before the final 800 m event, she had been in 2nd place overall after a good javelin throw.

In 2016, everything was focused on the 2016 Summer Olympics in Rio de Janeiro (Brazil). At the 2016 European Athletics Championships in Amsterdam in her home country, Broersen, who moved from ninth on the first day to fourth after winning the long jump and coming third in the javelin, but was unable to run the final 800 metres event due to an illness. Her teammate Anouk Vetter won the heptathlon event with a new national record of 6626 points. At the 2016 Summer Olympics she finished in a disappointing 13th place. Nevertheless, she made up the 2016 season by winning the heptathlon at the Décastar in Talence (France).

Injuries and comeback
The 2017 season started with a 5th place at the 2017 European Athletics Indoor Championships pentathlon, but she had to abandon at the Hypo-Meeting in Gotzis, sparing her ankle. At the World Championships heptathlon in London she had to abandon the event due to a hamstring injury, incurred at the long jump event. In Talence that year she failed to record a legal leap in the long jump and subsequently dropped out; the third incomplete heptathlon of the season.

In 2018 she could barely compete after she had torn the back cruciate ligament from her knee in November 2017 and a long rehabilitation followed. The 2019 season was the year of a comeback, despite an hamstring injury at national indoor pentathlon championship in February. At the Hypo-Meeting in Gotzis she finished 7th, and a month late she finished third at the Mehrkampf-Meeting Ratingen. At the 2019 World Athletics Championships in Doha she finished sixth.

Competition record

Personal bests
Outdoor

Indoor

References

1990 births
Living people
Dutch heptathletes
Olympic athletes of the Netherlands
Athletes (track and field) at the 2012 Summer Olympics
Athletes (track and field) at the 2016 Summer Olympics
People from Hoorn
World Athletics Championships athletes for the Netherlands
European Athletics Championships medalists
World Athletics Indoor Championships winners
Athletes (track and field) at the 2020 Summer Olympics
20th-century Dutch women
21st-century Dutch women
Sportspeople from North Holland